Giovanni Battista Marcola (c. 1711 -c. 1780) was an Italian painter, born and mainly active in Verona. He initially apprenticed with Simone Brentana. One of his pupils was his son Marco Marcola. He painted for the church of Santa Maria della Scala, a set of scenes of the Life of San Filippo Benizzi. He painted a Sant'Andrea Avellino with the Blessed Marinonio for the church of San Vincenzo in Modena.

Sources

References 

1710s births
1780s deaths
Painters from Verona
18th-century Italian painters
Italian male painters
18th-century Italian male artists